The 40th World Science Fiction Convention (Worldcon), also known as Chicon IV, was held on 2–6 September 1982 at the Hyatt Regency Chicago in Chicago, Illinois, United States.

The chairmen were Ross Pavlac and Larry Propp; Larry Smith and Bob Hillis were vice-chairmen.

Participants 

Attendance was 4,275.

Guests of Honor 

 A. Bertram Chandler (pro)
 Frank Kelly Freas (pro)
 Lee Hoffman (fan).
 Marta Randall (toastmaster)

Other notable participants 

Other notable attendees included Muppets creator Jim Henson and actor Jeff Pomerantz.

Awards

1982 Hugo Awards 

At Chicon IV, the Hugo Awards were made of a lucite rocket on a wooden base. This is the only time lucite was used for the award.

 Best Novel: Downbelow Station by C. J. Cherryh
 Best Novella: "The Saturn Game" by Poul Anderson
 Best Novelette: "Unicorn Variations" by Roger Zelazny
 Best Short Story: "The Pusher" by John Varley
 Best Non-Fiction Book: Danse Macabre by Stephen King
 Best Dramatic Presentation: Raiders of the Lost Ark
 Best Professional Editor: Edward L. Ferman
 Best Professional Artist: Michael Whelan
 Best Fanzine: Locus, edited by Charles N. Brown
 Best Fan Writer: Richard E. Geis
 Best Fan Artist: Victoria Poyser

Other awards 

 Special Award: Mike Glyer for "keeping the fan in fanzine publishing"
 John W. Campbell Award for Best New Writer: Alexis A. Gilliland

See also 

 Hugo Award
 Science fiction
 Speculative fiction
 World Science Fiction Society
 Worldcon

References

External links 

  
 NESFA.org: The Long List
 NESFA.org: 1982 convention notes 

1980s in Chicago
1982 conferences
1982 in Illinois
Culture of Chicago
Science fiction conventions in the United States
September 1982 events in the United States
Worldcon